Viscount Bridport is a title that has been created twice, once in the Peerage of Great Britain and once in the Peerage of the United Kingdom. The first creation became extinct in 1814, while the second creation is still extant.

History
Sir Alexander Hood, younger brother of Samuel Hood, 1st Viscount Hood, was a prominent naval commander. In 1794, he was created Baron Bridport in the Peerage of Ireland, with remainder to his great-nephew Samuel Hood, second son of Henry Hood (later 2nd Viscount Hood), eldest son of the 1st Viscount Hood, and in failure thereof to the heirs male of his uncle Alexander Hood (who was the ancestor of the Fuller-Acland-Hood Baronets of St Audries and the Barons St Audies). In 1796, he was created Baron Bridport, of Cricket St Thomas in the County of Somerset, in the Peerage of Great Britain, and in 1800, he was even further honoured when he was made Viscount Bridport, of Cricket St Thomas in the County of Somerset, also in the Peerage of Great Britain. The latter titles were created with normal remainder to the heirs male of his body. 

The 1st Viscount Bridport died without male issue in 1814, and the barony of 1796 and the viscountcy of 1800 became extinct. However, he was succeeded in the barony of 1794, according to the special remainder, by his aforementioned great-nephew, Samuel Hood, the 2nd Baron Bridport. He notably represented Heytesbury in Parliament. In 1810, the 2nd Baron Bridport married Lady Charlotte Mary Nelson, 3rd Duchess of Bronte, the only surviving child and heiress of William Nelson, 1st Earl Nelson, elder brother of Horatio Nelson, 1st Viscount Nelson. Lord Bridport was succeeded by his son Alexander Hood, the 3rd Baron Bridport. He was a General in the Army. In 1868, he was further created Viscount Bridport, of Cricket St Thomas in the County of Somerset and of Bronte, in the Peerage of the United Kingdom, a revival of the title given to his great-great-uncle sixty-eight years earlier. In 1873, he also inherited from his mother the title of Duke of Bronte (Italian: Duca di Bronte), of the Kingdom of Sicily and the Duchy of Maniace. This ducal title was conferred on his great-great-uncle, Horatio Nelson, in 1799 by King Ferdinand, as a reward for his support of the monarchy.

While his eldest son Arthur Hood succeeded him as 2nd Viscount Bridport, he left the Dukedom of Bronte to his younger son, the Hon. Sir Alexander Nelson Hood, who became the 5th Duke of Bronte. This was possible because of a special and unusual clause in the letters patent granting the dukedom, which allowed the title's holder to choose whoever he wanted as successor. The 2nd Viscount represented West Somerset in Parliament as a Conservative. He was succeeded by his grandson Rowland Hood, the 3rd Viscount Bridport and 6th Duke of Bronte. He was the son of the Hon. Maurice Henry Nelson Hood, who was killed in action at Gallipoli in 1915. The 3rd Viscount Bridport was a Lieutenant-Commander in the Royal Navy and also held minor political office from 1939 to 1940 under Neville Chamberlain.

The titles are currently held by his only surviving son, Alexander Hood, the 4th Viscount Bridport and 7th Duke of Bronte, who succeeded in 1969. As a descendant of Samuel Hood, 1st Viscount Hood, he is also in remainder to this peerage and its subsidiary titles.

Viscounts Bridport; First creation (1800)
Alexander Hood, 1st Viscount Bridport (1726–1814)

Barons Bridport (1794)
Alexander Hood, 1st Viscount Bridport, 1st Baron Bridport (1726–1814)
Samuel Hood, 2nd Baron Bridport (1788–1868)
Alexander Nelson Hood, 3rd Baron Bridport (1814–1904) (created Viscount Bridport in 1868)

Viscounts Bridport; Second creation (1868)
Alexander Nelson Hood, 1st Viscount Bridport (1814–1904)
Arthur Wellington Alexander Nelson Hood, 2nd Viscount Bridport (1839–1924)
Rowland Arthur Herbert Nelson Hood, 3rd Viscount Bridport (1911–1969)
Alexander Nelson Hood, 4th Viscount Bridport (b. 1948)

The heir apparent is the present holder's son, the Hon. Peregrine Alexander Nelson Hood (b. 1974).
The heir apparent's heir presumptive is his half-brother, the Hon. Anthony Nelson Hood (b. 1983).

Dukes of Bronte (1799)

The title of Duke of Bronte refers to the town of Bronte in Sicily. The title was granted in 1799 to the English vice-admiral Horatio Nelson by King Ferdinand III of Sicily.
 
The holders of this title have been:
Horatio Nelson, 1st Duke of Bronte, 1st Viscount Nelson (1758–1805)
William Nelson, 2nd Duke of Bronte, 1st Earl Nelson (1757–1835) (elder brother)
Charlotte Mary Nelson, 3rd Duchess of Bronte (1787–1873) (daughter)
Alexander Nelson Hood, 4th Duke of Bronte, 1st Viscount Bridport (1814–1904) (son) (previously created Viscount Bridport; see above)
Sir Alexander Nelson Hood, 5th Duke of Bronte (1904–1937) (younger son, by bequest)
Rowland Arthur Herbert Nelson Hood, 6th Duke of Bronte, 3rd Viscount Bridport (1911–1969) (great-nephew)
Alexander Nelson Hood, 7th Duke of Bronte, 4th Viscount Bridport (b. 1948) (son)

The heir apparent is the present holder's son, the Hon. Peregrine Alexander Nelson Hood (b. 1974).
The heir apparent's heir presumptive is his eldest daughter, Honor Linda Hood (b. 2016).

See also
Earl Nelson
Hood baronets
Viscount Hood

Notes

References

Kidd, Charles & Williamson, David (editors). Debrett's Peerage and Baronetage (1990 edition). New York: St Martin's Press, 1990 

The seven dukes of Bronte

External links

Viscountcies in the Peerage of the United Kingdom
Horatio Nelson
Viscount
Extinct viscountcies in the Peerage of Great Britain
Noble titles created in 1800
Noble titles created in 1868e